Elli Stamatiadou (born 1 April 1933 in Andros, Greece - died  1 May 2015, Athens, Greece) was a successful amateur Greek botanist.

Biography 
She was the chief curatorial assistant at the herbarium of Goulandris Natural History Museum (ATH), from 1965 to 2009 and the greatest contributor to the Museum’s botanical collections (23,705 specimens from all over Greece including over 20 type specimens). She retired in 2003 but continued working voluntarily until 2009.

Family 
She was married to Yiannis Stamatiadis, together they had 2 children. Their son Stamatis Stamatiadis is a soil microbiologist and he has developed the Soil Ecology and Biotechnology Laboratory at the Goulandris Natural History Museum.

Species 
The plant species Dianthus stamatiadae  Rech. f. (a Greek endemic plant species from the region of Kozani), Veronica stamatiadae M.A. Fischer & Greuter (a Veronica  species, first collected by Stamatiadou from the island of Ro in the Kastellorizo island group) and Allium stamatiadae are named after her.

Publications 
 Zahariadi, C., Stamatiadou, E. & Dima, A. 1982. Geographical distribution of species of Ornithogalum (Liliaceae) in Greece, including two new taxa. – Ann. Mus. Goulandris, 5: 131-162. 
 Snogerup, S., Snogerup, B., Stamatiadou, E., von Bothmer, R. & Gustafsson, M. 2006. Flora and vegetation of Andros, Kiklades, Greece. – Ann. Mus. Goulandris, 11: 85-270.

References 

1933 births
2015 deaths
Greek botanists
Women botanists